Leinetal is a Verwaltungsgemeinschaft ("collective municipality") in the district Eichsfeld, in Thuringia, Germany. The seat of the Verwaltungsgemeinschaft is in Bodenrode-Westhausen.

The Verwaltungsgemeinschaft Leinetal consists of the following municipalities:
 Bodenrode-Westhausen
 Geisleden 
 Glasehausen 
 Heuthen 
 Hohes Kreuz 
 Reinholterode 
 Steinbach
 Wingerode

References

Verwaltungsgemeinschaften in Thuringia